Savage Messiah is a Canadian thriller-drama film, released in 2002. The film dramatizes the real-life story of Roch "Moïse" Thériault, a cult leader who was arrested in Burnt River, Ontario, in 1989.

The film stars Luc Picard as Thériault, and Polly Walker as Paula Jackson, the social worker whose investigation revealed Thériault's crimes.

Synopsis 
Inspired by real-life events, Roch Thériault (Luc Picard), the head of a strange commune, lives with 2 men, his 10 wives and his 23 children. While visiting Burnt River, Ontario, a social worker (Polly Walker) suspects that the women of Thériault's commune are being abused. Despite the indifference of her co-workers, she undertakes an investigation that leads to terrible discoveries; a dead child, bizarre rituals, and serious cases of physical and psychological torture. In doing so, she puts her career and her life on the line. However, she is ready to overcome all obstacles to free the members of the community from Thériault's grip. She must also confront Thériault, who manipulates people and the system with astonishing ease, including court-appointed investigators.

References

External links
 
 

2002 films
Canadian drama films
English-language Canadian films
Films directed by Mario Philip Azzopardi
Quebec films
2000s Canadian films